Park Ju-won (born 19 October 1990) is a South Korean footballer who plays as goalkeeper for Chungnam Asan FC in K League 2.

Career
He was selected by Daejeon Citizen in the 2013 K League draft. He made his debut in the FA Cup match against Mokpo City on 9 April 2014.

In 2022, he left Daejeon Hana Citizen and joined Chungnam Asan FC.

References

External links 

1990 births
Living people
Association football goalkeepers
South Korean footballers
Daejeon Hana Citizen FC players
Asan Mugunghwa FC players
Chungnam Asan FC players
K League 1 players
K League 2 players